Guru Gobind Singh Public School or GGPS is a primary and secondary school in Sector VB, Bokaro Steel City, Jharkhand, India. It is registered with the CBSE. The school has three other branches, located in Chas, Dhanbad and Daltonganj.

Awards 
Winner of All Jharkhand Carmel Interschool Team Chess Tournament held at Carmel Junior College in senior category, best school with academic excellence in Jharkhand award by Hindustan, and more than over 57 prizes.

Controversies 

In 2011, row over transfer order of Director/Principal Daljeet Kaur took place. In 2017 a class 7 student attempted suicide, and a teacher at the school was subject to allegations of abuse.

Gallery

See also
Bokaro Steel City
Guru Gobind Singh
Mata Gujri

References

External links

GGPS Bokaro Wikimapia
Info about GGPS, Bokaro

Schools in Jharkhand
Bokaro Steel City